Chestnut Hill is an unincorporated community adjacent to the City of Weirton in Hancock County, West Virginia, United States.

Unincorporated communities in Hancock County, West Virginia
Unincorporated communities in West Virginia